The Dow process is the electrolytic method of bromine extraction from brine, and was Herbert Henry Dow's second revolutionary process for generating bromine commercially.

This process was patented in 1891. In the original invention, bromide-containing brines are treated with sulfuric acid and bleaching powder to oxidize bromide to bromine, which remains dissolved in the water. The aqueous solution is dripped onto burlap, and air is blown through causing bromine to volatilize. Bromine is trapped with iron turnings to give a solution of ferric bromide. Treatment with more iron metal converted the ferric bromide to ferrous bromide via comproportionation. Where desired, free bromine may be obtained by thermal decomposition of ferrous bromide.

Before Dow got into the bromine business,  brine was evaporated by heating with wood scraps and then crystallized sodium chloride was removed. An oxidizing agent was added, and bromine was formed in the solution. Then bromine was distilled.  This was a very complicated and costly process.

Preparation of phenol
Dow's Process may also refer to the hydrolysis of chlorobenzene in the preparation of phenol. Benzene can be easily converted to chlorobenzene by nucleophilic aromatic substitution via a benzyne intermediate. It is treated with aqueous sodium hydroxide at 350 °C and 300 bar or molten sodium hydroxide at 350 °C to convert it to sodium phenoxide, which yields phenol upon acidification.
When 1-[14C]-1-chlorobenzene was subjected to aqueous NaOH at 395 °C, ipso substitution product 1-[14C]-phenol was formed in 54% yield, while cine substitution product 2-[14C]-phenol was formed in 43% yield, indicating that an elimination-addition (benzyne) mechanism is predominant, with perhaps a small amount of product from addition-elimination (SNAr).

References

Chemical processes